The 1997 Oceania Cup was an international rugby league football tournament played in the Pacific region. The tournament was operated and contested by Super League-aligned countries during the Super League war as an alternative to the Pacific Cup.

Six teams contested the Cup. The 1997 tournament went ahead following the previous year's cancellation due to the unavailability of Australian teams when the tournament was replaced with a Pacific Challenge Series. Western Samoa withdrew from the tournament in disagreement with Super League-aligned authorities over promises that they believed were given to them.

The tournament was originally scheduled to have two pools, one based in New Zealand and one in Tonga, and the final was to be played as a curtain raiser to the Super League Tri-series final.

Teams
New Zealand Māori were coached by Cameron Bell and included Dean Clark, Tukere Barlow, Frank Watene, Darryl Beazley and Solomon Kiri.

New Zealand XIII were coached by Gary Kemble and included Glenn Coughlan, Blair Harding, Mike Dorreen, Iva Ropati, Shane Endacott, captain Aaron Whittaker, Mark Faumuina, Denvour Johnston, Hitro Okesene, Jerry Seuseu, Bryan Henare, Meti Noovao, Brad Williams, Joe Galuvao, Fa'ausu Afoa, Ben Fahey, Jason Kerapa, Keneti Asiata and Paul Staladi. Richard Stewart replaced Shane Endacott when he withdrew due to injury. Before the series began the New Zealand Māori bet the New Zealand XIII 21-19 at Ericsson Stadium.

Results

Group stage

Round 1

Round 2

Round 3

Table

Knock-out stage

5th place play-off

3rd place play-off

Final

References

Oceania Cup
Oce
International rugby league competitions hosted by New Zealand
Pacific Cup